Bhanu, Nepal is a former village development committee (VDC) in Tanahun District in the Gandaki Zone of western Nepal and now part of Bhanu Municipality. At the time of the 2011 Nepal census the VDC had a population of 13175 in 3476 households.

References

External links
UN map of the municipalities of Tanahu District

Populated places in Tanahun District